The Shifting Sands is the fourth book in the eight-volume Deltora Quest fantasy novel series written by Emily Rodda. It continues the trio's journey to find the seven missing gems of Deltora, braving dangers and Guardians in each book. The novel was first published in 2000 by Scholastic Australia.

Plot
The three go on their way towards the Shifting Sands from the City of the Rats when they spot an Ak-Baba in the sky. In order to hide from it, they dive under the River Broad and hide under their cloak. Surprisingly, they are aided by the fish of the river as well, which are rather intelligent. Later, once the threat has passed, they pass by an apple farm owned by an eccentric old woman known as Queen Bee. Hungry and tired, they decide to steal and eat from the apple orchard. Queen Bee reveals that she is not actually a fragile old woman, but a dangerous threat because of the bees that she hides under her shawl. The trio are promptly chased off by her deadly bees for stealing.

After some time on the road, they reach the town of Rithmere and started hearing about a competition called the Rithmere Games. Thinking they can win some money from it, they attempt to enter. But there is an entrance fee of one silver coin, and they have no money whatsoever. Lief, Jasmine, and Barda decide to let the operator of a game called Beat the Bird borrow Kree to spin the wheel thirty times, for a coin. In Beat the Bird, a bird would spin a wheel after a silver coin was paid. If the wheel lands on a number, the better is paid that number of silver coins. But if the wheel lands on a bird, the better only receives a worthless wooden bird figurine. After thirty turns, Kree senses something is amiss and pulls the table sheet, which reveals that the operator is controlling the wheel through the use of a pedal. The cheating operator then flees, leaving the coins that have fallen off the table sheet to the crowd. Lief, Barda, and Jasmine attempt to take some of the coins, but all that is left is a wooden bird.

The three decided to enter the Rithmere Games when they meet a scar-faced man named Doom, who they last saw at Tom's shop. They enter the games, and discover that the "games" are in fact fighting matches. Despite this fact, they enter anyway. Lief, Jasmine, and Barda are locked in their room in the night, but Mother Brightly, the host arrives and saves them. After the fights, Jasmine manages to win the one thousand gold prize for first place. Mother Brightly tells the trio about the secret passageway that they can use to leave. However, upon trying to use it, the trio is ambushed by Grey Guards. It is revealed that there was a scandal that the prize money would be returned to Mother Brightly for the next competition while benefiting from the audience. Lief, Jasmine, and Barda attempt to make off with the coins when Doom comes to them and helps them escape.

On foot, they finally reach the walls of the Shifting Sands. Lief starts to hear voices. The three hide from the Grey Guards, who are then eaten by a terrible insectile monster called a Sand Beast. Lief sees the Guards' belongings sinking into the sand and travelling to the center, in a place called the Hive. They arrive at the Hive, and Lief enters the hole full of treasures and replaces the lapis lazuli with the wooden bird to keep the structure of the piling treasures stable. He then climbs out of the Hive just before they are eaten by it. Lief fits the gem into the Belt of Deltora and their quest continues to the Dread Mountain.

Characters
Lief: Lief is the main character of the series. Lief was born to parents King Endon and Queen Sharn though he believed them to be Jarred and Anna of the forge. As a child Lief roamed the streets of Del, sharpening his wits and gaining him the skills needed for his future quests. Though he did not know it, he was constantly protected by Barda and he prided himself on his many 'lucky' escapes. On his sixteenth birthday it is revealed to him that he must begin a dangerous quest to find the lost gems of the Belt of Deltora.
Barda: Barda was enlisted as a friend by the king and queen of Deltora and was trusted to help him find the lost gems of Deltora sixteen years before the initial story took place. For the next sixteen years Barda disguised himself as a beggar so as to discover information vital to the quest. He also became the bodyguard of Endon and Sharn's child Lief, albeit without the semi-arrogant Lief's knowledge thereof. Upon Lief's sixteenth birthday Barda revealed himself to Lief and the quest for the gems of Deltora began. Though Barda was at first annoyed to travel encumbered by a child, he soon saw Lief as more of a help than a hindrance.
Jasmine: Jasmine is a wild girl, described as having wild black hair (dark green hair in the anime) and emerald green eyes who has grown up in the Forests of Silence, where Lief and Barda meet her shortly after leaving Del. Her parents, Jarred and Anna, were captured by Grey Guards when she was seven years old, and so she has been raised by the forest. She can understand the language of the trees and of many animals, and has incredibly sharp senses, but has trouble understanding some social customs. Jasmine is usually seen with her raven, Kree, and a mouse-like creature she calls Filli. Jasmine is like Lief and occasionally has a quick temper. After helping Lief and Barda in the forest and with the help of the topaz, she is greeted by her mother's spirit from beyond the grave, who tells her to go with Lief and Barda in their quest. After this encounter, she joins Lief and Barda in the search for the great gems that will complete the Belt.

See also

Deltora Quest 1
Deltora series
Emily Rodda
Characters in the Deltora series

References

External links
USA Deltora website
Australian Deltora Quest website
Emily Rodda's official website

2001 Australian novels
2001 fantasy novels
Australian children's novels
Australian fantasy novels
Children's fantasy novels
Deltora
2001 children's books